Ñuble National Reserve is a national reserve of Chile located in the Andes of Ñuble and Bíobio regions.

References

National reserves of Chile
Protected areas of Ñuble Region
Protected areas of Biobío Region